Roy A. Maxion is a research professor at School of Computer Science of Carnegie Mellon University. His research interests include biometrics, keystroke dynamics, and software reliability. His h-index is 30.

Editorial board 
 International Journal of Biometrics, editorial board member
 IEEE Security and Privacy, associate editor

Awards 
 2008, IEEE Fellow
 2019, IEEE/Dependable Systems and Networks Test of Time Award

References

External links 
 Maxion's Home Page

Carnegie Mellon University faculty
Fellow Members of the IEEE
Year of birth missing (living people)
Living people